Christine Coppa is an American author, blogger and columnist. She is best known for her book Rattled!, published by Broadway Books in 2009. The book was named a Target Breakout Book.

Early life 
Coppa grew up in Wayne and received a MFA in creative writing from the University of the Arts.

Career
Coppa is the founding blogger of glamour.com's Storked! blog. A professional writer/editor, she has contributed to Glamour, Marie Claire (Australia), Philadelphia Magazine, First, In Touch Weekly, and Pregnancy magazine among other publications. Her work was mentioned in The New York Times. The Sunday Times called her a writer "at the forefront of a wave of modern moms who are reinventing the parental publishing genre." New York Post called her "the ultimate sanctimommy". She appeared as herself in Murderball.

References

External links
 https://web.archive.org/web/20130327222613/http://christinecoppa.net/

Year of birth missing (living people)
Living people
21st-century American women
American bloggers
American women bloggers
Writers from New York (state)